Genoveva Añonman Nze (born 19 April 1989) is an Equatorial Guinean professional footballer who plays as a forward. She is the historical captain and top scorer of the Equatorial Guinea women's national team, for which she played for 16 years.

Club career
Añonman, nicknamed Ayo, played in her country and South Africa before signing for Bundesliga team USV Jena in 2009. She was the team's top scorer in both seasons she spent in Jena. Following the 2011 World Cup she signed for defending champions Turbine Potsdam. She became the first foreigner to win the Bundesliga top-scorer award when she scored 22 goals in the 2011–12 season. In 2012, she was named African Women Footballer of the Year.

On 24 February 2015, it was announced that Añonman signed for the Portland Thorns for the 2015 National Women's Soccer League season, joining after the completion of that year's World Cup. She was waived by Portland Thorns FC in October 2015. In 2016, she played for Suwon FMC WFC in the South Korean WK-League.

International career
Añonman was part of the Equatorial Guinea football team that won the 2008 African Women's Championship at home and finished runners up in South Africa two years later. After the 2010 African Women's Championship final, she and two other Equatoguinean players had been accused of being male by opponents. She rejected the allegations and was shown by a gender test to be female, wherein she was required to strip naked to demonstrate her gender.

Añonman played in the 2011 FIFA Women's World Cup, scoring Equatorial Guinea's only two goals in the tournament, in a 3–2 loss against Australia. She was included in the All-Star Team, becoming the first African player to earn this distinction. She won a second African Women's Championship in 2012, again at home.

International goals
Scores and results list Equatorial Guinea's goal tally first

Honors and awards

National team
Africa Women Cup of Nations: 2008, 2012

References
Notes

Citations

External links
 
 
 Genoveva Añonman – Profile on soccerdonna.de 
 Genoveva Añonman at FutbolEsta.com 

1989 births
Living people
People from Litoral (Equatorial Guinea)
Equatoguinean women's footballers
Women's association football forwards
FF USV Jena players
1. FFC Turbine Potsdam players
Portland Thorns FC players
Suwon FC Women players
Atlético Madrid Femenino players
Maccabi Kishronot Hadera F.C. players
MSV Duisburg (women) players
Frauen-Bundesliga players
National Women's Soccer League players
WK League players
Primera División (women) players
Ligat Nashim players
Equatorial Guinea women's international footballers
2011 FIFA Women's World Cup players
Equatoguinean expatriate women's footballers
Equatoguinean expatriate sportspeople in South Africa
Expatriate women's soccer players in South Africa
Equatoguinean expatriate sportspeople in Germany
Expatriate women's footballers in Germany
Equatoguinean expatriate sportspeople in the United States
Expatriate women's soccer players in the United States
Equatoguinean expatriate sportspeople in South Korea
Expatriate women's footballers in South Korea
Equatoguinean expatriate sportspeople in Spain
Expatriate women's footballers in Spain
Equatoguinean expatriate sportspeople in Israel
Expatriate women's footballers in Israel
African Women's Footballer of the Year winners